Sokol Lleshi (born 11 February 1996) is an Albanian professional footballer who plays as a midfielder.

References

1996 births
Living people
Association football midfielders
Albanian footballers
KF Korabi Peshkopi players
Kategoria e Parë players